Norma Rocío Nahle García (born 14 April 1964) is a Mexican politician and petrochemical engineer, member of the Movimiento Regeneración Nacional party. She is the current Secretary of Energy in the government of President Andrés Manuel López Obrador since 2018; previously, she was a federal deputy for the 11th District of Veracruz, based in Coatzacoalcos, and Coordinator of her party's Parliamentary Group in the Chamber of Deputies.

References 

Living people
1964 births
21st-century Mexican politicians
21st-century Mexican women politicians
Morena (political party) politicians
Cabinet of Andrés Manuel López Obrador
Mexican Secretaries of Energy
Politicians from Zacatecas
Deputies of the LXIII Legislature of Mexico
Women members of the Senate of the Republic (Mexico)
Autonomous University of Zacatecas alumni
Senators of the LXIV and LXV Legislatures of Mexico
Members of the Chamber of Deputies (Mexico) for Veracruz
Members of the Senate of the Republic (Mexico) for Veracruz
Women members of the Chamber of Deputies (Mexico)